This is a list of people executed in Virginia after 1976. The Supreme Court decision in Gregg v. Georgia, issued in 1976, allowed for the reinstitution of the death penalty in the United States. Capital punishment in Virginia was abolished by the Virginia General Assembly in 2021.

List of people executed in Virginia 
Between 1982 and 2017, a total of 113 people were executed by the Commonwealth of Virginia. All were convicted of capital murder; all but one were male. Between 1982 and 1990, all executions were carried out at the Virginia State Penitentiary in Richmond. After the prison closed in 1991, all subsequent executions were carried out at Greensville Correctional Center.

Demographics

See also 
 Capital punishment in the United States
 Capital punishment in Virginia
 Martinsville Seven

Notes

References

External links 
 Innocence Case Drew Unprecedented International Support
 113 people executed in Virginia since 1982

Virginia
 
People executed